The B.C. Icemen were an ice hockey team in the United Hockey League (UHL). They played in Binghamton, New York, at the Broome County Veterans Memorial Arena.

History
In 1997, the owners of the American Hockey League (AHL)'s Binghamton Rangers moved their franchise to Hartford, Connecticut, as the Hartford Wolf Pack. The team was replaced by the B.C. ("Broome County") Icemen of the lower-level United Hockey League (UHL). The B.C. Icemen logo was created by Endicott native, nationally syndicated cartoonist Johnny Hart, creator of the comic strip B.C.; the logo featured a stylized caveman, similar to those depicted in his comic strip, playing ice hockey. In 2001, the original local owners, Dave Pace, Mark Palombo, and Patrick Snyder, sold the franchise and the new owner, David Wright then initiated a move to bring back the AHL. Wright was forced to declare bankruptcy, but a new ownership group followed his lead and the Binghamton Senators, farm club of the Ottawa Senators of the National Hockey League (NHL), arrived.  Former B.C. Icemen include Keith Aucoin, Pete Vandermeer, Chris Allen, Dieter Kochan Brad Jones, and Boyd Kane.

The market was previously served by: Broome Dusters of the NAHL (1970–1977), Binghamton Whalers of the AHL (1980–1990), and the Binghamton Rangers of the AHL (1990–1997)
The franchise was followed by: Binghamton Senators of the AHL (2002–2017) and the Binghamton Devils of the AHL (2017–2021)

Year-by-year record

Team records
Goals: 52 Chris Grenville  (2000–01)
Assists: 59 Patrice Robitaille  (1999-00)
Points: 109 Chris Grenville  (2000–01)
Penalty minutes: 390 Pete Vandermeer  (1998–99)
GAA: 2.34 Erasmo Saltarelli  (2001–02)
SV%: .933 Erasmo Saltarelli  (2001–02)
Career goals: 160 Chris Grenville 
Career assists: 146 Chris Grenville 
Career points: 306 Chris Grenville 
Career penalty minutes: 643 Matt Ruchty  	
Career goaltending wins: 47 Dieter Kochan 
Career shutouts: 6 Dieter Kochan 
Career games: 303 Justin Plamondon

External links
The Internet Hockey Database – B.C. Icemen
- Binghamton Hockey.net - Hockey History in Binghamton, NY

Defunct United Hockey League teams
Sports in Binghamton, New York
Arizona Coyotes minor league affiliates
Ice hockey teams in New York (state)
Defunct ice hockey teams in the United States
Ice hockey clubs established in 1997
Sports clubs disestablished in 2002
1997 establishments in New York (state)
2002 disestablishments in New York (state)